The Drinking Water Inspectorate (DWI) is a section of Department for Environment, Food and Rural Affairs (DEFRA) set up to regulate the public water supply companies in England and Wales.

Based in Whitehall, it produces an annual report showing the quality of and problems associated with drinking water. Its remit is to assess the quality of drinking water in England and Wales, taking enforcement action if standards are not being met, and appropriate action when water is unfit for human consumption.

It was responsible for reporting on drinking water quality to the European Union under the European Drinking Water Directive (DWD), Council Directive 98/83/EC, which concerns the quality of water intended for human consumption. It provides advice to DEFRA on the transposition of European water legislation in England and Wales.

References

External links
 Official website

Department for Environment, Food and Rural Affairs
Water supply and sanitation in England and Wales